The 1975–76 Boise State Broncos men's basketball team represented Boise State University during the  NCAA Division I basketball season. The Broncos were led by third-year head coach Bus Connor and played their home games on campus at the Bronco Gym in Boise, Idaho.

The Broncos were led on the court by senior center Pat Hoke and sophomore guard Steve Connor, the coach's son.

No Broncos were named to the all-conference team; Hoke and Connor were on the second team, and senior guard Terry Miller was honorable mention.

In the first year of the conference tournament, the Broncos defeated the other co-champions: Idaho State in the first round, and host Weber State in the final in double overtime. They advanced to the NCAA tournament, their first in Division I; six years earlier in 1970, they had advanced to the College Division tournament (now Division II).

Boise State met fourth-ranked UNLV in the first round at McArthur Court in Eugene, Oregon; the Runnin' Rebels were up by nine points at the half, and won by 25 points,  The Broncos' next NCAA appearance was twelve years later, in 1988.

Postseason results

|-
!colspan=5 style=| Big Sky tournament

|-
!colspan=5 style=| NCAA tournament

References

External links
Sports Reference – Boise State Broncos – 1975–76 basketball season

Boise State Broncos men's basketball seasons
Boise State
Boise State
Boise State